Korean masks have a long tradition with the use in a variety of contexts. Masks of any type are called tal  in Korean, but they are also known by many others names such as gamyeon, gwangdae, chorani, talbak and talbagaji. Korean masks come with black cloth attached to the sides of the mask designed to cover the back of the head and also to simulate black hair.

Purpose
They were used in war, on both soldiers and their horses; ceremonially, for burial rites in jade and bronze and for shamanistic ceremonies to drive away evil spirits, to remember the faces of great historical figures, and in the arts, particularly in ritual dances, courtly, and theatrical plays. The present uses are as miniature masks for tourist souvenirs, or on cell-phones where they hang as good-luck talismans.

There are two ways to categorize masks: religious masks and artistic masks. Religious masks were often used to ward off evil spirits and the artistic masks were mostly used in dances and theater shows.

Dance masks
Masks which use for  dance in Korea are about 250 types and they vary in shape. Masks in central district usually look pretty and similar to human face more and in the southern province masks are for satire and are Shamanistic.

Shamanistic masks
The often horrifying or grotesque masks were used in shamanistic practices for their ability to evoke fear, and humor, in ceremonial rites. The masks were often made of alder wood, with several coats of lacquer to give the masks gloss, and waterproof them for wearing. They were usually also painted, and often had hinges for mouth movement. A mask is used to perform ancestral rites or to drive away evil spirits by wearing a mask.

Typically one sees the following some of which are designated as national cultural properties. The Hahoe, Sandae and Talchum are all traditional Korean mask dramas of ritual and religious significance.

Hahoe Byeolsin gut is a kind of exorcist play while performers wear mask such as yangbantal (nobleman), bunetal, seonbital (scholar), gaksital (bride), chorangital, halmital(grandmother), jujital (head monk), jungital (monk), baekjeongtal (butcher), and imaetal.

Cultural assets and national treasures
The mask play of Hahoe Byeolsin Exorcism itself was classified as important intangible cultural asset #69 by the South Korean government on November 17, 1980. Hahoe(Korean : 하회) and Byeolsin masks themselves were also labelled South Korean national treasure  #121 at the same time. The Hahoe mask dance is one of the folk dramas of Pungcheon Hahoe village in Andong city, and dates from the Goryeo Dynasty.

Gallery

See also

Korean culture
Korean theatre
Korean art
Hahoe village
Talchum

References 

4. Joung, Madeline. “Face Mask Culture Common in East, New to West.” Voice of America, Voice of America, 2 Apr. 2020, https://www.voanews.com/science-health/coronavirus-outbreak/face-mask-culture-common-east-new-west

5.Fouser, Robert J. “Why Koreans Wear Face Masks.” The Korea Herald, The Korea Herald, 4 Nov. 2020, www.koreaherald.com/view.php?ud=20201104001023. http://www.koreaherald.com/view.php?ud=20201104001023

6. Kim, Catherine. “What a Korean Teenage Fashion Trend Reveals About the Culture of Mask-Wearing.” POLITICO, POLITICO, 11 Aug. 2020
https://www.politico.com/news/magazine/2020/08/11/what-a-korean-teenage-fashion-trend-reveals-about-the-culture-of-mask-wearing-393204

External links

Korean performance masks
Korean Drama Traditional
bigbasket.pk
masksheets.com

Korean culture
Masks in Asia
Ritual masks